Joseph Newman Mantiply (born March 1, 1991) is an American professional baseball pitcher for the Arizona Diamondbacks of Major League Baseball (MLB). He previously played for the Detroit Tigers and New York Yankees.

Career

Amateur
Mantiply was drafted by the New York Mets in the 48th round of the 2009 Major League Baseball Draft out of Tunstall High School in Dry Fork, Virginia. He did not sign with the Mets and attended Virginia Tech to play college baseball. In 2010, he played summer baseball with the Bethesda Big Train of the Cal Ripken Collegiate Baseball League.  In 2011, he played collegiate summer baseball with the Harwich Mariners of the Cape Cod Baseball League. After his junior season, he was drafted by the Philadelphia Phillies in the 28th round of the 2012 MLB Draft. He again did not sign and returned to Virginia Tech for his senior season.

Detroit Tigers
After his senior season, Mantiply was drafted by the Detroit Tigers in the 27th round of the 2013 MLB Draft. He made his professional debut that season with the Connecticut Tigers. After starting his career as a starting pitcher, Mantiply became a relief pitcher in 2014. He started the season with the West Michigan Whitecaps and was later promoted to the Double-A Erie SeaWolves. Mantiply was called up and made his major league debut on September 3, 2016.

New York Yankees
On November 8, 2016, Mantiply was claimed off waivers by the New York Yankees. He was released on November 28, and signed a new minor league contract in December 2016. He elected free agency on November 6, 2017.

Cincinnati Reds
On November 13, 2017, Mantiply signed a minor league contract with the Cincinnati Reds. On March 9, 2018, Mantiply underwent Tommy John surgery, and was out for 2018. On October 11, 2018, Mantiply resigned a minor league deal for the 2019 season.

New York Yankees (second stint)
On August 9, 2019, Mantiply was traded to the New York Yankees in exchange for cash considerations. On August 11, the Yankees selected Mantiply's contract. He made his 2019 debut on August 12, against the Baltimore Orioles. He earned his first major league win after relieving Chad Green for three innings. On August 13, Mantiply was designated for assignment. He became a free agent following the 2019 season.

Arizona Diamondbacks
On January 20, 2020, Mantiply signed a minor league deal with the Arizona Diamondbacks. On September 1, 2020, the Diamondbacks selected Mantiply's contract to the active roster. With the 2020 Arizona Diamondbacks, Mantiply appeared in 4 games, compiling a 0-0 record with 15.43 ERA and 2 strikeouts in 2.1 innings pitched. On September 28, 2020, Mantiply was designated for assignment by the Diamondbacks. He resigned on a minor league deal on November 2, 2020. On May 15, 2021, Mantiply was selected to the active roster.

In 2022, Mantiply was named to the National League All-star team as a reliever. It was his first All-star selection.

References

External links

Virginia Tech Hokies bio

1991 births
Living people
Arizona Diamondbacks players
Baseball players from Virginia
Chattanooga Lookouts players
Connecticut Tigers players
Detroit Tigers players
Erie SeaWolves players
Glendale Desert Dogs players
Harwich Mariners players
Louisville Bats players
Major League Baseball pitchers
National League All-Stars
New York Yankees players
Scranton/Wilkes-Barre RailRiders players
Sportspeople from Danville, Virginia
Toledo Mud Hens players
Virginia Tech Hokies baseball players
West Michigan Whitecaps players